The Beeston transport interchange, also known as Beeston Centre tram stop, is an interchange between the trams of the Nottingham Express Transit (NET) network and local buses. It is in the centre of the town of Beeston in Nottinghamshire, England.

The interchange is built on the site of Styring Street and an adjacent multi-storey car park, which was demolished before construction began. It is modelled on a successful design used on the Strasbourg tram system in France, and comprises two staggered island platforms. Trams serve the outer faces of the platforms, using their off-side doors, whilst the inner faces each provide three bus stands that are served by local bus services. An elongated facing crossover allows outbound trams to terminate in the inbound platform. Vehicular access to the interchange is restricted to buses and trams.

The interchange opened to buses on 12 July 2015 and has replaced the previous Beeston bus station, which was situated nearby. The tram stop within the interchange opened on 25 August 2015, along with the rest of NET's phase two.

Tram services
The stop is on line 1 of the NET, from Hucknall via Nottingham city centre to Beeston and on to Chilwell, and is shown as Beeston Town Centre on NET publicity. Trams run at frequencies that vary between 4 and 8 trams per hour, depending on the day and time of day.

Bus services
The interchange is served by the following day time bus routes:

Gallery

References

Nottingham Express Transit stops
Transport in the Borough of Broxtowe
Beeston, Nottinghamshire
Railway stations in Great Britain opened in 2015